Tonb-e Jaki (also Romanized as Tonb-e Jakī; also known as Tonb-e Chīgī) is a village in Dezhgan Rural District, in the Central District of Bandar Lengeh County, Hormozgan Province, Iran. At the 2006 census, its population was 62, in 12 families.

References 

Populated places in Bandar Lengeh County